Tipperary Crystal is an Irish design company based in Dublin.  Tipperary Crystal is an Irish crystal design and manufacturing company founded in 1987 by former Waterford Crystal -craftsmen In Ireland.

In 1996, there was a high court case about the shareholding in which three minority shareholders complained about their actual share holding.

Examples of the collection are in the collection of the Hunt Museum.

See also 
 Tyrone Crystal

References

External links

 Global website
 Irish website

Glassmaking companies of Ireland
Manufacturing companies based in Dublin (city)
Irish brands